John Kiddle (born 28 June 1958) is an Anglican priest: in September 2015 he was appointed Archdeacon of Wandsworth.

He was educated at Monkton Combe School, Bath; Queens' College, Cambridge and Ridley Hall, Cambridge. He was ordained in 1983. After a curacy at St Peter and St Paul, Ormskirk he held incumbencies in Huyton and Watford. He was a Canon Residentiary at St Albans Cathedral from 2010 until his appointment as Archdeacon.

References

1958 births
People educated at Monkton Combe School
Alumni of Queens' College, Cambridge
Alumni of Ridley Hall, Cambridge
Archdeacons of Wandsworth
Living people